The Quekett Microscopical Club is a learned society for the promotion of microscopy. Its members come from all over the world, and include both amateur and professional microscopists. It is a registered charity and not-for-profit publisher, with the stated aims of promoting the understanding and use of all aspects of the microscope.

History 

The Club was founded in 1865 as a result of a letter from W. Gibson published in Science Gossip in May 1865 suggesting that “some association among the amateur microscopists of London is desirable”.

The suggestion was taken up by Mordecai Cubitt Cooke, Thomas Ketteringham and Witham Bywater, and they met on 14 June 1865 and agreed a provisional committee. About sixty people attended the first meeting of the Club on Friday 7 July 1865 for the purpose of establishing the Club to “give amateurs the opportunity of assisting each other, holding monthly meetings in a central locality, at an annual charge to cover incidental expenses”. The name agreed was “The Quekett Microscopical Club”, ‘club’ was chosen instead of ‘society’ to reflect the aims of the association. The first President was Edwin Lankester.

The Club is named after the famous Victorian microscopist Professor John Thomas Quekett, and is the second oldest organisation in the world dedicated to microscopy; the oldest is the Royal Microscopical Society.

Some of the traditions of the Club’s Victorian founders are continued, but the Quekett is now very much a friendly club for today’s microscopists and covers all aspects of the subject ranging from the history of the microscope and slide collecting to the latest advances in digital imaging with the microscope.

Past Presidents 
Several eminent scientists have been presidents of the Club, including Edwin Lankester (1865–66), Peter le Neve Foster (1869), Lionel Smith Beale (1870–71), Robert Braithwaite (bryologist) (1872–1873), Henry Lee (1875–77), Thomas Henry Huxley (1877–79), Thomas Spencer Cobbold (1879–80), Mordecai Cubitt Cooke (1881–83), William Benjamin Carpenter (1883–85), William Dallinger (1889–92), George Edward Massee (1899-1903), Edward Alfred Minchin (1908-1912) Arthur Dendy (1912–16), Alfred Barton Rendle (1916–21), Sir David Prain (1924–26), William Thomas Calman (1926–28), John Ramsbottom (1928–31) and Hamilton Hartridge (1951–54).

Other notable members
 David Lawrence Bryce FRSE (1856–1934)

Membership 
Members include amateurs, professionals, beginners and experts with an interest in microscopes, microscopy or microscope slides.

Members receive 2 issues of the scholarly Quekett Journal of Microscopy and 2 issues of the informal Bulletin of the Quekett Microscopical Club each year.

Members have access to a private area of the Club’s website that includes meeting reports, videos of lectures, and galleries of entries from slide and photograph competitions.

Meetings 
The Club holds monthly meetings in London for its members, normally in the Natural History Museum, and a few meetings in other parts of the United Kingdom. During the warmer months, the Club arranges excursions where members can collect specimens and examine them using their own microscopes. The Club holds an annual exhibition in the Natural History Museum each autumn.

Reports of meetings are published in the Club’s Bulletin and on its website.

Publications 
The Club’s publications include the amateur-friendly Bulletin of the Quekett Microscopical Club (available only to members), the peer-reviewed Quekett Journal of Microscopy which has been published in an unbroken run since 1868, and a range of books.

References 

Microscopy organizations
Scientific societies based in the United Kingdom
1865 establishments in England
Charities based in London
Publishing companies based in London
Non-profit academic publishers